The Departmental Council of Finistère is the deliberative assembly of the Finistère department in the region of Brittany. It consists of 54 members (general councilors) from 27 cantons.

The President of the General Council is Maël de Calan.

Vice-Presidents 
The President of the Departmental Council is assisted by 12 vice-presidents chosen from among the departmental advisers. Each of them has a delegation of authority.

See also 

 Finistère
 General councils of France

References

External links 

 

Finistère
Departments of Brittany
Brittany